Economic entomology is a field of entomology, which involves the study of insects that benefit or harm humans, domestic animals, and crops. Insects that pose disadvantages are considered pests. Some species can cause indirect damage by spreading diseases, and these are termed as disease vectors. Those that are beneficial include those that are reared for food such as honey, substances such as lac or pigments, and for their role in pollinating crops and controlling pests.

The Journal of Economic Entomology, published by the Entomological Society of America, described itself in 2017 as the "most-cited entomological journal".

History
In the 18th century many works were published on agriculture. Many contained accounts of pest insects. In France Claude Sionnest (1749–1820) was a notable figure.

19th century

In Britain, John Curtis wrote the influential 1860 treatise Farm Insects, dealing with the insect pests of corn, roots, grass and stored grain. Fruit and pests were described by authors such as Saunders, Joseph Albert Lintner, Eleanor Anne Ormerod, Charles Valentine Riley, Mark Vernon Slingerland in America and Canada. The pioneers in Europe were Ernst Ludwig Taschenberg, Sven Lampa (1839–1914), Enzio Reuter (1867–1951) and Vincenze Kollar. Charles French (1842–1933), Walter Wilson Froggatt (1858–1937) and Henry Tryon (1856–1943) pioneered in Australia. 

It was not until the last quarter of the 19th century that any real advance was made in the study of economic entomology. Among the early writings, apart from the book of Curtis, there was a publication by Pohl and Kollar, entitled Insects Injurious to Gardeners, Foresters and Farmers, published in 1837, and Taschenberg's Praktische Insecktenkunde. During the 19th century, Italian entomologists made significant progress in controlling diseases of the silkworm moth, in the control of agricultural pests and in stored product entomology. Significant figures were: Agostino Bassi ( 1773–1856), Camillo Rondani (1808–1879), Adolfo Targioni Tozzetti (1823–1902), Pietro Stefanelli (1835, 1919), Camillo Acqua (1863–1936) Antonio Berlese (1863–1927), Gustavo Leonardi(1869–1918) and Enrico Verson (1845–1927). In France, Etienne Laurent Joseph Hippolyte Boyer de Fonscolombe, Charles Jean-Baptiste Amyot, Émile Blanchard, Valéry Mayet and Claude Charles Goureau were early workers, as was Jean Victoire Audouin, the author of Histoire des insectes nuisibles à la vigne et particulièrement de la Pyrale, Philippe Alexandre Jules Künckel d'Herculais, Joseph Jean Baptiste Géhin and Maurice Jean Auguste Girard. American literature began as far back as 1788, when a report on the Hessian fly was issued by Sir Joseph Banks; in 1817 Thomas Say began his writings; while in 1856 Asa Fitch started his report on Noxious Insects of New York. Also in America, Matthew Cooke wrote Treatise on the Insects Injurious to Fruit and Fruit Trees of the State of California, and Remedies Recommended for Their Extermination, published in 1881. The Englishman Frederick Vincent Theobald wrote A textbook of agricultural zoology in 1890. It became a standard text worldwide. Notable foresters were Herman von Nördlinger (1818–1897) and Julius Theodor Christian Ratzeburg (1801–1871).

20th century
Among the most important reports early in the 20th century were those of Charles Valentine Riley, published by the U.S. Department of Agriculture, extending from 1878 to his death, in which an enormous amount of valuable material is embodied. After his death, the work fell to Professor Leland Ossian Howard, in the form of Bulletin of the U.S. Department of Agriculture. The chief writings of J. A. Lintner extend from 1882 to 1898, in yearly parts, under the title of Reports on the Injurious Insects of the State of New York. Another significant contributor to the entomological literature of the United States was Charles W. Woodworth. The Florida entomologist Wilmon Newell was a pioneer of pest control as was Clarence Preston Gillette. In India, Thomas Bainbrigge Fletcher succeeded Harold Maxwell-Lefroy and Lionel de Nicéville as Imperial Entomologist and wrote Some South Indian insects and other animals of importance considered especially from an economic point of view, an influential work in the subcontinent. In France Alfred Balachowsky was a key figure.

Developments in the last quarter of the 20th century consisted of new techniques and theories that were pioneered and developed, including Integrated Pest Management by Ray F. Smith.

Harmful insects 

Insects considered pests of some sort occur among all major living orders with the exception of Ephemeroptera (mayflies), Odonata (dragonflies), Plecoptera (stoneflies), Embioptera (webspinners), Trichoptera (caddisflies), Neuroptera (in the broad sense), and Mecoptera, as well as the lesser known groups Zoraptera, Grylloblattodea, and Mantophasmatodea. Conversely, of course, essentially all insect orders primarily have members which are beneficial, in some respects, with the exception of Phthiraptera (lice), Siphonaptera (fleas), and Strepsiptera, the three orders whose members are exclusively parasitic.

Insects are considered pests for a variety of reasons, including direct damage by feeding on crop plants in the field or by infesting stored products, indirect damage by spreading viral diseases of crop plants (especially by sucking insects such as leafhoppers), spreading disease among humans and livestock, and annoyance to humans. Examples of insects regarded as pests include the phylloxera, migratory locusts, the Colorado potato beetle, the boll weevil, Japanese beetle, aphids, mosquitoes, cockroaches, the Western corn rootworm, and some fly species.

In the past entomologists working on pest insects attempted to eradicate species. This rarely worked except in islands or controlled environments and raised ethical issues. Over time the language changed to terms like control and management. The indiscriminate use of toxic and persistent chemicals and the resurgence of pests in the history of cotton growing in the US has been particularly well studied.

Beneficial insects

Honey is perhaps the most economically valuable product from insects. Beekeeping is a commercial enterprise in most parts of the world and many forest tribes have been dependent on honey as a major source of nutrition. Honeybees can also act as pollinators of crop species. Many predators and parasitoid insects are encouraged and augmented in modern agriculture.

Silk is extracted from both reared caterpillars as well as from the wild (producing wild silk). Sericulture deals with the techniques for efficient silkworm rearing and silk production. Although new fabric materials have substituted silk in many applications, it continues to be the material of choice for surgical sutures.

Lac was once extracted from scale insects but is now replaced by synthetic substitutes. The dye extracted from cochineal insects was similarly replaced by technological advances.

The idea of insects as human food, entomophagy, widely practised in traditional societies, has been proposed as a solution to meet the growing demand for food, but has not gained widespread acceptance in the West. Insects can also be used in the forensic setting as well as in the medical veterinary setting. Some Diptera (flies) and Coleoptera (beetles) will urinate on a corpse to assess its time of death. Fly larvae can also be used to feed on living or dead tissue, and this technique is used to help treat wounds, called maggot therapy.

References

Further reading
Entomologia Generalis Journal of general and Applied Entomology (current emphasis on pest management and control) (Entomologia Generalis)
Journal of Economic Entomology
European and Mediterranean Plant Protection Organisation Leads through to species accounts through the Quarantine List; see also the  Alert List
Insect Vectors of Plant Pathogens
Forest Insect Pest data in Canada since 1990
 Hill, D. S. (1983). Agricultural Insect Pests of the Tropics and their Control. Cambridge University Press.
 Metcalf, C. L. and W. P. Flint (1925). Destructive and Useful Insects.

Pest insects
Subfields of entomology
History of zoology
Insects in culture